The Devils Hole Hills are a mountain range in Nye County, Nevada.

References 

Mountain ranges of the Mojave Desert
Amargosa Desert
Mountain ranges of Nye County, Nevada
Mountain ranges of Nevada